Erik Largen is an American ice hockey coach and former player who is currently in charge of the program at Alaska Fairbanks.

Career
Largen is a Fairbanks native, being born and raised in the area. After graduating from West Valley High he spent a year playing for two teams in the NAHL before enrolling at Alaska Fairbanks in 2006. Largen served as a backup goalie for two years, playing a total of four games, before ending his playing career.

After leaving the university Largen remained in the area, joining the staff of the Fairbanks Ice Dogs as a goaltending coach. In his first the Ice Dogs reached the Robertson Cup Finals and claimed the championship the following year. Largen received his first head coaching job in 2011 when he joined the Twin Cities Northern Lights In his two seasons with the team Largen guided them to a collective 87-9-2 record, consecutive Bush Cup victories and a national runner up finish in 2013. Beginning in 2013 Largen was an assistant with the Tri-City Storm but left around the new year when he was offered a better position with the Janesville Jets. He remained with the Jets for a year and a half, helping the team claim the regular season title in 2015.

In 2015 Largen returned to the college ranks as the head coach for Marian. After a slow start the Sabres caught fire after the new year and won 13 consecutive games before being stopped by #1 St. Norbert. Marian was ranked 12th by the end of the season and finished with an 18-7-3 record but just missed out on the 11-team national tournament. After the successful season Largen jumped to the Division I ranks and accepted the assistant coaching job with his alma mater.

After one season back with the Nanooks head coach Dallas Ferguson left to take over the Calgary Hitmen and he was replaced by Lance West with Largen continuing in the same role. At the time it wasn't revealed that West was only an interim head coach due to the incomplete hiring process. After the season this necessitated the position becoming available once more and though West was a candidate once more, the university decided to go with Largen instead.

College Head coaching record

References

1986 births
Living people
Sportspeople from Fairbanks, Alaska
American men's ice hockey centers
Ice hockey people from Alaska
Ice hockey players from Alaska
Alaska Nanooks men's ice hockey players
Alaska Nanooks men's ice hockey coaches